Plesanemma fucata, the lemon gum moth, is a moth of the family Geometridae. The species was first described by Rudolf Felder and Alois Friedrich Rogenhofer in 1875. It is found in the southern half of Australia.

The larvae feed on Eucalyptus species.

References

Nacophorini
Taxa named by Alois Friedrich Rogenhofer